Alistair Casey (born 23 February 1981) is a Scottish Capped Professional badminton player.

Playing career
In 2011 he went out in the first round of the World Championships but was runner up at the Mexico International and Semi Finalist of the Suriname International. In 2012 he was the winner of both the Botswana and South Africa Internationals.

Achievements

BWF International Challenge/Series
Men's singles

Men's doubles

 BWF International Challenge tournament
 BWF International Series tournament
 BWF Future Series tournament

Coaching Career 
 
Casey coached for the U.S. Olympic Team at the 2016 Summer Olympics in Rio de Janeiro. He was also the coach and team leader for the USA Badminton team at the 2020 Summer Olympics in Tokyo.

Casey is the coach of the Polytechnic School Badminton team. They compete in the CIF Southern Section.

References

External links
 
 
 
 

1981 births
Living people
Sportspeople from Glasgow
Scottish male badminton players